The Imperial Coach (in German: Imperialwagen) was the golden carriage of the Imperial and Imperial Austrian court in Vienna. It is now kept in the Imperial Carriage Museum at Schönbrunn Palace.

See also 
 Gold State Coach of the British monarchy
 Gouden Koets of the Dutch monarchy

References

Further reading 
 Martin Haller: Pferde unter dem Doppeladler. Olms/Verlag Stocker, Graz 2002, ISBN 978-3487084305
 Oswald M. Klotz: Der letzte einer Zunft: Krönungskutschenbauer. In: Die Presse. K.u.k. Hoflieferanten heute (X)/14. Februar, 1977.

External links 

 https://www.khm.at/objektdb/detail/1289843/

Austrian monarchy
Collections of the Kunsthistorisches Museum
History of transport in Austria
Official state cars
Royal carriages